Cupper may refer to:

People
Marvin Cupper (born 1994), German ice hockey goaltender
Ralph Cupper (born 1954), English organist, director, and composer
Richard Cupper (died 1580s), English politician
"The Cupper", nickname of Lee Grosscup (born 1936), American football player

Others
 Cupper, a person who engages in coffee cupping or coffee tasting
 Cuppers, a term for intercollegiate sporting competitions at the Universities of Oxford and Cambridge
 CUAFL Cuppers, a competition in the Cambridge University Association Football League

See also 
 Copper
 Cuper (disambiguation)